Sumayia Zafar Suzana is a former Bangladeshi tv actress, model. She became a model in many music video and acted in many plays.

Career 
Zafar started working as a model in 2001. She has done several TV commercials and in 2003 she won the Lux Photogenic Beauty Contest Award. She acted with singer Shafin Ahmed in the six episode drama "Rhyme of Life", and has appeared in some Eid al-Fitr dramas including Onukoron and Patrider Janano Jachchhey Je.

She was a model in the music video "Keu Na januk", a song by Tahsan and composed by Imran, and appeared in other music videos including Tumi Ashba Naki and Ami Chuye Dilei. She also appeared in two music videos, Bhalo Lage Na and Arale, with her ex-husband, the singer Hridoy Khan.

Personal life 
Zafar has been married twice, to businessman Faysal and singer Hridoy Khan. She divorced Hridoy Khan in 2015.

References 

Living people
Bangladeshi television actresses
Bangladeshi female models
Year of birth missing (living people)